Donald Gordon Cobden (11 August 1914 – 11 August 1940) was a New Zealand All Black rugby player, No 430 in 1937. He was a wing.

He played for Canterbury, and was selected for the first test against the Springboks in August 1937. His test (and All Black) career only lasted 25 minutes, as he was severely injured in a bad tackle. As he was walking and greeted the team at the end of the game, a national selector said he should have returned to the field, and proposed to veto his further selection.

Cobden went to England in 1937, and in 1938 joined the Royal Air Force on a short service commission. In England he played for Catford Bridge, Kent, the RAF and the Barbarians.

He was posted to No. 74 Squadron RAF, which was flying Spitfires from RAF Hornchurch in Essex during the Battle of France and then the Battle of Britain. On 11 August 1940, he was despatched with members of 76 Squadron to protect a convoy, and they engaged a large group of Messerschmitt BF 110s about 10 miles off the coast of Harwich. He was last seen attacking a number of enemy aircraft, and failed to return. He was posted missing – on his 26th birthday. He is buried at Oostende new communal cemetery.

He was born in Christchurch and educated at Christchurch Boys' High School. His brother Alfred, a professional cricketer, was killed in North Africa in 1942 while with the New Zealand Army.

References

Gone But Not Forgotten: The Commemoration of Rugby Players Who Died in the Two World Wars Commonwealth War Graves Commission, pamphlet c2002.

External links

1914 births
1940 deaths
New Zealand international rugby union players
People educated at Christchurch Boys' High School
Royal Air Force personnel killed in World War II
New Zealand rugby union players
Rugby union players from Christchurch
Royal Air Force pilots of World War II
Royal Air Force officers
Missing in action of World War II
Rugby union wings